The Zheti Zhargy (also transliterated as "Jeti Jarği", original "Жеті Жарғы", lit. "Seven Charters") was the set of laws introduced in the Kazakh Khanate by Tauke Khan c. 1680-1718. 

 1st zhargy: Death sentence to those who would start an uprising (To save the consistency of the country)
 2nd zhargy: Death to those who would betray the Turkic people
 3rd zhargy: Death to a murderer
 4th zhargy: Death to those who would dishonour a wife of the other
 5th zhargy: Death to a thief
 6th zhargy: If in case of fight, one would damage the eyes of the other, he must give away his woman or equal price (Қалын - the amount of wealth which is given to the parents of the girl by a fiancé wedding before)
 7th zhargy: If one would steal a horse, he must return ten.

References

Further reading
 Seit Kenzheahmetuly, Ulttyk Adet Guryptyn Beimalim 220 Turi

Kazakh Khanate
Legal codes